Doom is the debut studio album by American hip hop group Mood. Released on September 23, 1997, the album features production by Hi-Tek and guest appearances by Talib Kweli and Wu-Tang-affiliated group Sunz of Man. It features one single, "Karma", whose b-side is "Cincinnati". Doom launched the careers of Talib Kweli, Hi-Tek, and Lone Catalysts. Producer J.Rawls of Lone Catalysts is also experiencing commercial success as a soloist in Europe and Japan.

Track listing

References

1997 debut albums
Hi-Tek albums
Albums produced by Hi-Tek